"The Greatest Show" is a song performed by Hugh Jackman, Keala Settle, BriaAndChrissy, Zac Efron and Zendaya for the film The Greatest Showman (2017). It is the opening track from The Greatest Showman: Original Motion Picture Soundtrack (2017). Despite not being released as an official single, "The Greatest Show" was the 18th biggest song of 2018 in the United Kingdom.

Charts

Weekly charts

Year-end charts

Certifications

Reimagined version

For The Greatest Showman: Reimagined (2018), the song was covered by American rock band Panic! at the Disco.

Critical reception

Rolling Stones Ryan Reed wrote that the Panic! at the Disco's version "[...] stays faithful to the original's theatrical arrangement of brass fanfare and densely layered harmony vocals", and "beefs up the rhythm section with a booming drum sound and ends the track with a Queen-styled guitar solo.

In other media

The song was the official theme song for WWEs Backlash 2020 for "The Greatest Wrestling Match Ever".

Charts

Year-end charts

Certifications

References

2017 songs
2018 singles
Atlantic Records singles
Hugh Jackman songs
Keala Settle songs
Panic! at the Disco songs
Pentatonix songs
Zac Efron songs
Zendaya songs
Songs from The Greatest Showman
Songs from Pasek and Paul musicals
Songs written by Benj Pasek
Songs written by Justin Paul (songwriter)
Songs written by Ryan Lewis